Shine Technologies (stylized as SHINE Technologies, where "SHINE" originated as an acronym for "subcritical hybrid intense neutron emitter"), formerly named SHINE Medical Technologies, is a private corporation based in Janesville, Wisconsin. As of February 2016, the company was planning to build a facility to produce radioactive isotopes for medical applications.

Business model 
In 2009, the supply of molybdenum-99 (Mo-99), a precursor to technetium-99m used in more than 30 medical imaging procedures, fell short of demand due to maintenance idling of a pair of research reactors, one located in the Netherlands, forcing doctors to use more dangerous isotopes.  By 2016, the largest global supplier of the isotope, a Canadian research reactor, was scheduled to go idle.  In 2010, the National Nuclear Security Administration (NNSA), a part of the United States Department of Energy, began funding a number of method development ventures aimed at ensuring that shortages in the United States could be avoided as well as reducing the use of highly enriched uranium and with it lowering the risk of nuclear proliferation.

SHINE was among a handful of early recipients of funds from the NNSA program and received  through it as of 2014.

Several companies in addition to SHINE were vying for part of this market, and the need for redundancy in production was expected to support a number suppliers beyond the minimum needed to meet current demand.

The company had plans in 2015 to start production-scale generation of isotopes in 2018, having pushed the proposed start date back several times, and it secured a number of supply agreements predicated on this start date.

SHINE also secured a  National Science Foundation grant in 2014 to develop production methods for Iodine-131, which is used in the treatment of Graves' disease and certain cancers.

Facilities and technology 
Original technology for production of Mo-99 was reactor-based and unavoidably produced significant nuclear waste.  SHINE developed plans to use particle accelerator technology developed at the University of Wisconsin–Madison by company founder Gregory Piefer.  The method, referred to as "neutron generator technology", uses helium and free neutrons, produced by colliding a beam of deuterium particles with tritium gas, to bombard low-level enriched uranium targets leading to the production of "useful isotopes with minimal waste".  In addition to the diagnostically useful Mo-99, the process can also produce Iodine-131, which is used in medical treatments.

In 2013, SHINE constructed a full-scale prototype particle accelerator at their facility in Monona, Wisconsin, to be used to demonstrate the technology. Eight accelerators would be used at the Janesville facility.

On June 15, 2015, Argonne National Laboratory demonstrated that SHINE's production, separation and purification process could produce Mo-99 which meets purity specifications of the British Pharmacopoeia.

The NRC approved SHINE's construction permit for a facility in Janesville, Wisconsin in late February 2016. If constructed, the facility would still require NRC licensing to operate. In 2014 the facility was originally slated for opening in 2016, and the planned opening was then delayed to 2017. As of February 2016, construction was planned for 2017 with production potentially beginning in 2019.

References

External links 

2010 establishments in Wisconsin
Nuclear medicine organizations
Dane County, Wisconsin
Janesville, Wisconsin
Health care companies based in Wisconsin